The IBON Foundation is a non-profit research, education and information-development institution with programs in research, education and advocacy based in the Philippines. It provides socioeconomic research and analysis on people's issues to various sectors (primarily grassroots organizations). It aims to contribute to people's empowerment through education and advocacy support. The foundation is also engaged in international solidarity work.

History

1970s
The early 1970s were characterized by information control and civil-rights violations after the Marcos dictatorship declared martial law in the Philippines. Resistance to state attacks on people's rights intensified, and there was a need for information on socioeconomic issues.
The IBON Foundation was founded in 1978 by Sister Mary Soledad Perpiñan (editor and chief coordinator), Sally Bulatao (chief researcher and finance officer) and Antonio Tujan (former political detainee, graphic artist and circulation manager), six years after the declaration of martial law in the Philippines.
IBON published a fact sheet, IBON Facts and Figures, to provide readers with an overview of facts about important national and local issues. From an initial press run of 200 copies, popular response triggered the printing of an additional 2,000 copies of the first issue.

The first issue of IBON Facts and Figures was produced using a borrowed mimeograph machine. IBON first operated in a Religious of the Good Shepherd (RGS) Welcome House community on Zamora Street in Pandacan, Manila. Volunteers from the urban-poor community provided stick drawings, and economists and students were asked for written contributions or help with drafting issues. Organized sectors (such as trade unions) began requesting issue-specific fact sheets and industry primers. Public support ushered the institution into fully organizing and professionalizing its services.
From 1978 to 1980, IBON Facts and Figures became an 8-page thematic publication which was a data source for researchers, speakers, writers and seminar facilitators. Its research featured political-economic realities and the relationship between local and international socioeconomic issues.
By the 1980s, IBON Foundation  had become a non-governmental organization (NGO).

1980s
IBON established the IBON Databank in 1982 to provide socioeconomic data to researchers, policy-makers, educators, other NGOs and people's organizations. Ekonokomiks was launched in 1984 as a publication for the grassroots organization.
At this time, IBON went through a rocky period of regularizing its services and departments. After what it described as a lull in providing cutting-edge policy research “and advancing the public debate through a clear analysis on major issues such as agrarian reform, national industrialization and liberalization”, IBON reorganized and “embarked on a long-term research agenda towards research development on national industrialization.”

1990s
IBON devised a self-sufficiency program through cross-subsidies between revenue-generating services, subsidized services, maximization of resources, and institutional efficiency and professionalism. Self-evaluation and feedback from friends, clients and allies helped IBON reorganize its programs and services.
The Databank and Research Center was expanded, conducting in-depth research and advocacy studies, and aiming to improve the quality of its books and publications. Sectoral service desks for workers, peasants, women, indigenous people and the environment were also developed.
IBON began conducting quarterly surveys on a national-capital, regional and nationwide basis. From the Seminars Program the People's Education and Research Center (PERC) was organized in 1997. The Institute of Political Economy (IPE) was also established as an independent research and educational body, producing journals on theoretical research and introductory training courses on political economy.

IBON's Media Center evolved from media-support activities such as IBON Features, which presented social issues to the general public. IBON sa Himpapawid was a weekly, recorded radio program which also aimed to promote socioeconomic consciousness to a wider audience. IBON Video is a full-service production and post-production facility with a video library of IBON-produced educational videos and documentary films.
The IBON Partnership for Education Development (IPED) was also established. By 1998, the IPED expanded IBON's services to partner schools nationwide under the banner of Transformative Education (TE).
During this decade, the foundation also expanded its international networking and advocacy support and its services to Visayas and Mindanao with regional offices in Cebu City and Davao City.

2000s
IBON further developed its emphasis on people's issues and support for the capacity building of people's organizations in research, education, information and advocacy work.
The institution consolidated its advocacy and research orientations by ensuring that its research and publications would cover the urgent issues of the day and expanding its sustained information support and awareness raising. It also revitalized its capacity-building efforts by offering a wide range of advocacy-support services: seminars and training, information-network management and documentation for sectoral and regional people's organizations.
Popular education materials and training modules have been systematized. The IBON Birdtalk, a semiannual briefing on socioeconomic and political assessment and trends, was a regular event. The foundation also sponsors the Usapang IBON, a grassroots version of the Birdtalk which contributes to community and sector campaigns.

The IPED has more than 200 partner schools nationwide, and originated a TE-based critique of the 2002 Revised Basic Education Curriculum of the Philippine government. It provided lectures to teachers and administrators on the implementation of an integrative and context-based learning process. IPED was instrumental in establishing the Educators Forum for Development (EFD) for the development of cooperation and fellowship among educators toward relevant national education. It also organizes the annual National Educators' Conference and provides seminars to schools.
IBON also became an international publisher, networking with international outfits such as ZED Books and Global Outlook. Its catalog was broadened to make Philippine books available internationally and alternative international publications accessible locally.
During the first decade of the century, IBON International was established and expanded from providing services and contributing to building support to solidifying its role in establishing and sustaining international networks and campaigns. It also linked global initiatives to local campaigns and advocacy.
In 2006 the IBON Foundation moved from its Old Santa Mesa office to its own office building, the IBON Center in Quezon City. The building houses all the foundation's programs and services.

Programs and centers
The foundation is a multi-center, multi-program institution with research, education and information as its main focus.
The IBON Databank and Research Center is a core program which provides information and analysis on socioeconomic issues for advocacy issues, education, policy-making, development planning and implementation for non-government organizations, people's organizations, academic institutions, government agencies and individuals. Research is the core of its programs with the aim of disseminating the information in popular forms particularly (but not solely) for advocacy purposes.
The foundation's research agenda was developed to help provide alternative solutions to problems in production, livelihood and services at the community level. Included are industry and agrarian studies, research on transnational corporations and agribusinesses, comparative studies of economies, resource profiles of Philippine regions and studies on the impact of these socioeconomic conditions on social sectors.
There are also community-based people's action research initiatives on production, economic uplift and advocacy. IBON uses participatory methodology in research and attempts to democratize the research process through community-based people's action research.
The Databank and Research Center also manages the quarterly IBON Surveys, in which it gathers data on people's economic conditions and opinions about issues.

IBON's People's Education Resource Center (PERC) (formerly the Seminars Program) provides comprehensive, informal education to grassroots sectors. It produces popular education materials and audio-visual aids on socioeconomic and other issues and training modules on skills training and leadership formation.
The IBON Partnership in Education for Development (IPED) is an alternative center for formal education which aims to promote transformative education through its partnership with schools. This includes teacher training, textbook development and supplementary educational materials at the elementary and secondary levels.
IBON International provides research, education and advocacy support to people's movements and grassroots empowerment abroad, linking these to international initiatives and networks.
To implement its centers and programs, IBON is organized into three administrative sections, seven departments and a printing press.

Networks
IBON is an active participant in a number of networks tackling people's issues in the local and international arenas:

AidWatch Philippines – National network of grassroots-based and -oriented NGOs working on official development assistance (ODA) issues in the country. It aims to bring together and deepen relationships among a wide range of organizations for collaboration among NGOs on aid-related issues and concerns.

Asia Pacific Research Network (APRN) – Established in 1998 as a result of networking among research organizations and NGOs in Asia following conferences in 1997, its objective is to channel and focus NGO research efforts towards supporting information, education and advocacy needs of grassroots organizations.

Better Aid – International network aiming for aid effectiveness

Buy Pinoy Build Pinoy – Venue for Filipino producers and consumers to work together building a pro-Filipino economy. With the slogan “Buy Pinoy, Build Pinoy”, it aims to give Filipino producers the means and opportunity to excel in local and foreign markets while encouraging Filipino consumers to patronize locally produced goods and services.

No Deal! Movement Against Unequal Economic Agreements - Coalition of organizations and individuals opposed to unequal economic agreements. It advocates democratic governance, economic sovereignty, building the national economy and economic relationships based on equality and mutual benefit.

Pagbabago! People's Movement for Change – Broad-based national movement for people to make their voices heard. It fosters “new politics” (government from below); advocates supervision of leadership by a politically aware, empowered people and encourages leadership support. With a track record of being pro-people, pro-Filipino and honest, it calls for a government which relies on the continuing consent and support of the governed rather than coercive means to maintain power.

Our World is Not For Sale (OWINFS) – Worldwide network of organizations, activists and social movements committed to challenging trade and investment agreements which advance the interests of powerful corporations at the expense of people and the environment.

People's Movement on Climate Change (PMCC) – Global campaign which aims to provide a venue for the grassroots (especially from the south, the most affected and least empowered to adapt to climate change) to participate in the process of drawing up a post-2012 climate-change framework.

People's Coalition on Food Sovereignty (PCFS) – Growing network of grassroots groups of small food producers (particularly peasant-farmer organizations and their support NGOs), working towards a People's Convention on Food Sovereignty.

Philippines Transparency and Accountability Council (PTAC, an Independent People's Council) – Organization of non-partisan individuals, groups and sectors opposed to corruption.

RESIST! – International campaign to draw a broad aggregate of people worldwide who are opposed to neoliberal globalization and war.

The Reality of Aid – North/south international non-governmental collaboration focusing exclusively on analysis and lobbying for poverty-eradication policies and practices on the international-aid front

Water for the People Network – Campaign involving research, education, people's action, legislation and legal struggles, local and international networking, aimed at opposing moves by government, multilateral-funding institutions and large local and multinational corporations to privatize water resources, systems and utilities, making profits at the expense of people

IBON also participates in the following networks:
Consumer International
World Association for Christian Communication (WACC)
Commission Number 2 of the International League of People's Struggles (ILPS)

References

External links

 Ibon Foundation Website
 Ibon International Website
 Good Shepherd Sisters history

Foundations based in the Philippines